Mendham's Point is a locality near the present day Lion Gate at Colaba in Mumbai. Until 1760, the English buried their dead at Mendham's Point. Gerald Aungier, Governor of Bombay, had planned extensive fortifications for Bombay from Dongri in the north to Mendham's Point in the south.

References
This township offers insight into the city's past
The Seventeenth Century
Time was when Bombay had a mighty fort...
Fortifying colonial legacy

Neighbourhoods in Mumbai